Union of Writers Chuvash Republic (in 1992–2001 – Union of the Chuvash Writers) — The Writers' Union of the Chuvash Republic – public creative organization for writers living in the Chuvash Republic, as well as writers, writing in the Chuvash language.

Structure of the organization 

The Writers' Union of the Chuvash Republic has five of its branches: in the cities of Mariinsky Posad (head – V. Saveliev-Saruy), in Novocheboksarsk (head – V.P. Pugachev), in Ulyanovsk (head – N.N. Larionov), in the villages: of Urmary (head-N.I. Ivanov Parhatar) in Batyrevo (head – V.V. Vladimirov).

History 
On June 30, 1923 at the meeting of workers of the Chuvash book publishers and employees of the newspaper "Kanash" was established the Chuvash writers Community (Union Chuvash writers and journalists). Charter of the organization was approved July 1, 1923. The founders were writers Nikolai Yut, N. Patman, Nikolay Shooboushynni, S. Khoomma, S. Lashman and others.

After the creation in 1934 of the Union of Soviet Writers, Community of the Chuvash writers and journalists has been transformed into the Union of Writers of the Chuvash Autonomous Soviet Socialist Republic. This Union has worked until 1991.

In 1991 the Union was a split in two organizations: the Union of Writers of the Chuvash Republic (is registered by the Ministry of Justice of the Chuvash Republic at 4 January 1992) and the Union of Chuvash Writers (20 February 1992). Both organizations on an equal footing are the legal successors of the Chuvash Autonomous Soviet Socialist Republic of the Union of Writers.

In autumn 2001 the Writers Union of the Chuvash Republic was divided into two parts: the Union of Writers of Chuvash Republic "Hurantash" and the Union of the Professional Writers of the Chuvash Republic.

To maintain continuity and Commonwealth Writers' Association of Writers, the Union of the Chuvash Writers registered in the Ministry of Justice as the Union of the Writers of the Chuvash Republic.

Chairs

See also 
 Simbirsk Chuvash School
 Chuvash national symbols

References

External links 
 Союзу чувашских писателей 80 лет/ Union Chuvash writers 80 years
 Михаил Юхма рассказал о бедственном положении Союза писателей Чувашии/ Michael Yuhma highlighted the plight of the Writers' Union of Chuvashia
 К 90-летию Союза писателей Чувашской Республики/ On the 90th anniversary of the Union of Writers of the Chuvash Republic
 Меня приняли в Союз писателей Чувашской Республики/ I was admitted to the Union of Writers of the Chuvash Republic

Russian writers' organizations
Culture of Chuvashia
Chuvash culture